Columbia Gas of Massachusetts, the assumed name of Bay State Gas Company, is a supplier of retail natural gas to over 300,000 customers in parts of Massachusetts surrounding Springfield, Brockton, and Lawrence. It is a subsidiary of NiSource.  The company's operations in New Hampshire and Maine were sold to Unitil Corporation in 2008.

2018 Merrimack Valley gas explosions

On September 13, 2018, starting at approximately 4:20 PM, three Merrimack Valley communities supplied by Columbia—Lawrence, Andover, and North Andover, Massachusetts—suffered numerous fires and explosions as a result of an over-pressurized subterranean gas line. Massachusetts authorities evacuated the communities and the American Red Cross deployed and set up numerous shelters in nearby communities for those who were displaced by the explosions and subsequent fires. On September 14, Governor of Massachusetts Charlie Baker declared a state of emergency, and issued a decree appointing Eversource to evaluate and oversee the management of the gas distribution system in the affected area.

The company remained without response for almost an entire day following the incidents in Lawrence, North Andover, and Andover. The CEO was criticized by the governor, as well as several town and city leaders.

See also
NiSource
Merrimack Valley gas explosions

References

External links
Columbia Gas of Massachusetts homepage

Natural gas companies of the United States
Companies based in Massachusetts